Swavesey railway station was a station in Swavesey, Cambridgeshire on the line between Cambridge and St Ives which was closed for passenger services in 1970. The station remained derelict until it was demolished in 2007 for construction of the Cambridgeshire Guided Busway service which utilises the trackbed of the old railway.

References

External links
Swavesey station on navigable 1946 O. S. map
Swavesey station on Subterranea Britannica

Disused railway stations in Cambridgeshire
Former Great Eastern Railway stations
Railway stations in Great Britain opened in 1847
Railway stations in Great Britain closed in 1970
Beeching closures in England
1847 establishments in England